Taranga is a Jain  pilgrimage center near Kheralu in Mehsana district, Gujarat, India, with two compounds of Jain temples that are important examples of the Māru-Gurjara style of architecture. The Ajitnatha temple, was constructed in 1161 by the Chaulukya king Kumarapala, under the advice of his teacher, Acharya Hemachandra. Both the main sects of Jainism are represented, with adjoining walled compounds: the Svetambara compound consists of 14 temples in all, and there are also five Digambara-affiliated temples at Taranga hill.

History and monuments
Taranga became an important Jain pilgrimage site in the 12h century. In Kumarapal Pratibodha of Somaprabhacharya, composed in Vikram Samvat 1241, states the local Buddhist king Veni Vatsaraja and Jain monk Khaputacharya had built a temple for goddess Tara and thus the town was named Tarapur.

The hill is for the most part covered with brushwood and forest is, on the east and west, crossed by a road that lead to a plateau where stand the temples built of white sandstone and brick. The major Ajitanatha temple was built by Chaulukya king Kumarapala (1143 - 1174) after he became a follower of Jainism under his teacher Acharya Hemchandra.

Ajitanatha Jain temple

The temple is a fine example of Māru-Gurjara style, completed in 1161, which remains largely intact, and in religious use.  The shikhara and the much lower superstructure over the mandapa are both among the "most complicated" in the style.  The former begins with three rows of bhumija-style miniature towers in clusters, before turning to the sekhari style higher up, where the miniature towers are of varying lengths, and overlap.  Over the mandapa, the lowest level continues the regular miniature tower clusters over the sanctuary, above which shallow pitched planes of roof are studded with miniature towers, with rows of beasts and urns along the edges of the planes.  The surfaces are heavily decorated with figures and "honeycomb" gavaksha decoration, the figures "characterized by lively poses and sharply cut faces and costumes".

The red interior of the temple throws out in strong relief the 2.75 m white marble figure of Ajitnath, the second Tirthankara seated in the shrine, decorated with precious stones let into the marble.  The features wear the usual expression of deep repose or quiet covert scorn. On the right hand side of the temple, there are footprints of Rishabha and of the 20 Tirthankaras and on the left hand side, there are a temple of Gaumukha, the Samavasarana, and the Jambudvipa painting. Tejpala, brother of Vastupala, installed idols of Adinatha and Neminatha in the temple. On the outer platform of the main temple, there are idols of Padmavati and Kumarapala himself.

The special times of pilgrimage are during the full moon in the months of Kartika and Chaitra (November and April). In the adjoining shrines are various images. In one is an upright block of marble with 208 representations of the Tirthankara.

Digambar Jain temples
Digambars settled on this isolated hill with its three rocky peaks in early times. It is said that 35,000,000 monastics, including the Ganadharas Varadutta and Sagardutta, attained moksa here. The two hillocks named Kotishila and Siddhashila have shrines with idols of the Tirthankaras, Neminath and Mallinath dated Vikram Samvat 1292. There are 14 Digambara temples in the foothills and a Digamabar dharamshalas is at the foothills. On the highest elevation of the three-peaked hill, there stands a "Tonk", a shrine built by Digambars, it houses a marble statue of the nineteenth Tirthankara, Mallinath.

The oldest temple in compound dedicated to Sambhavanatha was built in Maru-Gurjara architecture. Based on its construction style and ornamentation, according to historian Madhusudan Dhaky, it was built before 1030 CE.

Buddhist monuments
The earliest archaeological were reported in 1938. The Taranga hill bears the name of Taringa or Taranga, probably from a shrine of Taran Mata. About 2.5 km north of the hill, the shrines of Taran Mata and Dharan Mata is situated near a natural stream. The idol of Taran Mata is dated to 8th-9th century based on its style. The construction of the right side of the stream is probably an altered Buddhist stupa.

There are also ancient cave shelters. Nearby cave, locally known as Jogida ni Gafa has a relics of four Buddhist statues known as Dhyani Buddhas under the Bodhivriksha. The cave was used by Buddhist monks years ago.

Archaeology
In 2009, Gujarat State Archeology Department found 4 km long fortification southwest of Taranga hills. It is estimated that it belongs to 3rd or 4th century BCE. It could be the historical Anarta or Anandpur which is generally identified with Vadnagar now.

Gallery

See also

 Jainism in Gujarat

References

Citations

Sources

Book

Web

Bibliography
Michell, George (1990), The Penguin Guide to the Monuments of India, Volume 1: Buddhist, Jain, Hindu, 1990, Penguin Books, 

Jain temples in Gujarat
Mehsana district
Religious buildings and structures completed in 1121
1121 establishments in Asia
Cultural history of Gujarat
Tourist attractions in Mehsana district
12th-century Jain temples
12th-century establishments in India